is a private junior college in Saku, Nagano, Japan, established in 1988.

History 
 1988 Shinshu Junior College (Faculty of Business) was established.
 2001 The name of Faculty of Business was changed to Faculty of Business and Information.
 2002 Faculty of Life Management was established.
 2006 Health and Sports Division and Care and Welfare Division was founded in Faculty of Life Management.
 2010 Faculty of Life Management was reorganized to Faculty of Care and Welfare. The name of Faculty of Business and Information was changed to Faculty of Interated Business.
 2013 Faculty of Integrated Business was closed.

Faculties 
 Faculty of Care and Welfare
 Care Course
 Business Course

See also 
 Saku University

External links
 Official website 

Educational institutions established in 1988
Private universities and colleges in Japan
Universities and colleges in Nagano Prefecture
Japanese junior colleges
Saku, Nagano
1988 establishments in Japan